Alice Schertle (born 1941) is an American poet, teacher, and author from Los Angeles. She is known as the author of numerous children's books, most notably the New York Times best-selling Little Blue Truck series.

Career 
Schertle worked for a time as an elementary school teacher. As a children's book author, her works "explore themes of nature and language, often with playful use of rhyme."

Schertle has also published several collections of poetry. She has won a number of honors, including the Lee Bennett Hopkins Poetry Award and the Christopher Award.

Little Blue Truck 
Schertle collaborated with illustrator Jill McElmurry to create Little Blue Truck, a friendly pick-up truck with a variety of animal friends. The first book, Little Blue Truck, was published in 2008. A starred review in Publishers Weekly noted that Shertle's "rhyming stanzas are succinct, and she gives readers plenty of opportunities to chime in with animal and vehicle noises."

After McElmurry's death in 2017, her estate gave permission for others to continue the books in her style. For instance, Good Night, Little Blue Truck (2019) lists Schertle's and McElmurry's names on the front cover, while text inside the book notes that it is "Illustrated by John Joseph in the style of Jill McElmurry."

Personal life 
Schertle was born in 1941 in Los Angeles, California. She attended the University of Southern California and the University of California, Los Angeles.

Works

The Little Blue Truck series 
Illustrated by Jill McElmurry

 Little Blue Truck (2008)
 Little Blue Truck Leads the Way (2009)
 Little Blue Truck's Christmas (2014)
 Little Blue Truck's Halloween (2016)
 Little Blue Truck's Springtime (2018)
 Good Night, Little Blue Truck (2019)
 Little Blue Truck's Valentine (2020)
 Time for School, Little Blue Truck (2021)
 Little Blue Truck Makes a Friend (2022)

The All You Need... series 
Illustrated by Barbara Lavallee

 All You Need for a Snowman
 All You Need for a Beach

The Jeremy Bean series 

 Look Out, Jeremy Bean!
 Jeremy Bean's St. Patrick's Day

Other titles 

 The April Fool (1981)
 William and Grandpa (1989), illustrated by Lydia Dabcovich
 How Now, Brown Cow? (1994), illustrated by Amanda Schaffer
 Advice for a Frog (1995)
 Keepers (1996)
 I Am the Cat (1999), illustrated by Mark Buehner
 Down the Road (2000), illustrated by E.B. Lewis
 When the Moon is High (2003)
 1, 2, I Love You (2004), illustrated by Emily Arnold McCully
 We (2007) illustrated by Kenneth Addison
 Very Hairy Bear (2007), illustrated by Matt Phelan
 Button Up! (2009), illustrated by Petra Mathers
 Such a Little Mouse (2015), illustrated by Stephanie Yue
 ¡Pío Peep! Traditional Spanish Nursery Rhymes (2019) – English adaptations of selections by Alma Flor Ada and F. Isabel Campoy
 Cathy and Company series (with Cathy Pavia)
 The Skeleton in the Closet (illustrated by Curtis Jobling)
 Teddy Bear, Teddy Bear (illustrated by Linda Hill Griffith)
 A Lucky Thing (illustrated by Wendell Minor)
 An Anaconda Ate My Homework! (illustrated by Aaron Renier)
 Good Night, Hattie, My Dearie, My Dove
 Witch Hazel (illustrated by Margot Tomes)
 The Adventures of Old Bo Bear (illustrated by David Parkins)
 Maisie (illustrated by Lydia Dabcovich)
 Bill and the Google-Eyed Goblins (illustrated by Patricia Coombs)
 That Olive! (illustrated by Cindy Wheeler)

References 

1941 births
Living people
American children's writers
American women children's writers
20th-century American writers
21st-century American writers
20th-century American women writers
21st-century American women writers
University of California, Los Angeles alumni
University of Southern California alumni